The fourth Cowper ministry was the ninth ministry of the Colony of New South Wales, and fourth occasion of being led by Charles Cowper.

Cowper was elected in the first free elections for the New South Wales Legislative Assembly held in March 1856, and fought unsuccessfully with Stuart Donaldson to form Government. When Donaldson's Government faltered a little over two months after it was formed, Cowper formed Government on the first occasion, but he also lost the confidence of the Assembly a few months later. Cowper formed Government on the second occasion between 1857 and 1859; but it also lost the confidence of the Assembly. On the third occasion, Cowper formed Government following the decision by Premier John Robertson to step aside and focus on land reform, however Cowper then lost the confidence to James Martin. Cowper retained government by defeating Martin at the 1864–65 general election.

The title of Premier was widely used to refer to the Leader of Government, but not enshrined in formal use until 1920.

There was no party system in New South Wales politics until 1887. Under the constitution, ministers were required to resign to recontest their seats in a by-election when appointed. Such ministerial by-elections were usually uncontested however on this occasion a poll was required in East Sydney (Charles Cowper), The Glebe (Thomas Smart) and  West Sydney (John Darvall and John Robertson). Each minister was comfortably re-elected. Only The Paterson (William Arnold) was uncontested.

This ministry covers the period from 3 February 1865 until 21 January 1866, when Martin was asked to form government after Cowper again lost the confidence of the Assembly in December 1865.

Composition of ministry

 
Ministers are members of the Legislative Assembly unless otherwise noted.

See also

Self-government in New South Wales
Members of the New South Wales Legislative Assembly, 1864–1869
First Cowper ministry (1856)
Second Cowper ministry (1857–1859)
Third Cowper ministry (1861–1863)
Fifth Cowper ministry (1870)

References

 

New South Wales ministries
1865 establishments in Australia
1866 disestablishments in Australia